"Popular" is an English language song written by Fredrik Kempe and performed by Swedish singer Eric Saade. It is the second single from Saade's second album Saade Vol. 1 and was the Swedish entry in Eurovision Song Contest 2011. It was first released on 28 February 2011 in Sweden and topped the Swedish Singles Chart. It has been covered by Elena Paparizou.

Background
The song was written by Fredrik Kempe and produced by Peter Boström.

Eurovision Song Contest
On 19 February 2011, Eric Saade competed in the third semi-final of Melodifestivalen 2011 with Popular. He won the final on 12 March 2011 with 193 points overall and was the Swedish entry for Eurovision Song Contest 2011.

During his performance, Saade had a glass box wall on stage that is supposed to break. In the first rehearsal, this did not work. Therefore, Sweden had an extra rehearsal in 2011. About the rehearsals in Eurovision Song Contest, Saade said:  "It feels great after the first rehearsal. I just focused on all the important stuff, like cameras and angles. I'm gonna focus a little bit more on the singing and dancing part on the next rehearsal".

Saade performed on 12 May 2011 in the second semi-final of Eurovision Song Contest in eighth position in the lineup. Popular was the last song to have been announced to qualify for the Grand Final. It was later revealed that he finished first in the second semi-final. On 14 May 2011, he performed the song in the final in seventh position in the lineup. Saade came in third place with 185 points, which was the best result for Sweden since 1999 when Charlotte Perrelli won with the song Take Me to Your Heaven. It was also Sweden's fifth third place in Eurovision history. He came in second place in the televoting only two points behind the winner Azerbaijan.

Other versions
An album remix and a slow version of the song were released on 14 March 2011 in Sweden.
On 25 May 2011, a remix by the SoundFactory was released in Sweden.
In March 2012, Greek-Swedish singer Helena Paparizou sang her version of "Popular" during a pause in the final of the 2012 Melodifestivalen.  Her performance was recorded and released as a single, her first in five years in Sweden.
As a part of an interval act for Melodifestivalen 2013 the song was parodied by Ann-Louise Hanson, Towa Carson and Siw Malmkvist as "Pensionär". It was also released on an EP the same year.
In the fall of 2017, Tomas Andersson Wij released a Swedish language cover version of the song titled "Den dag jag vinner allt" as a part of the eight season of Så mycket bättre.

Critical reception
In general, Popular received positive reviews from critics. Popjustice wrote that it is better than their entry for Eurovision Song Contest 2011 and that "this is just one of the songs that will make the United Kingdom look stupid at this year's Eurovision.“

Awards, nominations and certifications
The song won the ESC Radio Award 2011 in the category Best Song and the Scandipop Award 2012 in the category Best Male Single. It was also nominated for a Rockbjörnen Award 2011 in the category Best Swedish Song and is nominated for a Grammi 2012 in the category Song of the Year. The SoundFactory Remix of the song was nominated for a Scandipop Award 2012 in the category Best Remix.

Popjustice.com has named the song Song of the Day. On 15 May 2011, the same website has named the slow version Song of the Day. In December 2011, the same website has listed the original song on number three of their list 45 Best Singles 2011.

As of July 2011, Popular has been sold over 40.000 times and received Double Platinum in Sweden.

Music video
A censored version of the music video of the song was released on 14 April 2011. The music video includes a dance battle.

Charts

Weekly charts

Year-end charts

Certifications

Release history

References

External links
Eric Saade Official Website
Eric Saade Official Facebookpage

2011 singles
Eurovision songs of 2011
Eurovision songs of Sweden
Melodifestivalen songs of 2011
Eric Saade songs
Helena Paparizou songs
Eurodance songs
Songs written by Fredrik Kempe
Number-one singles in Sweden
2011 songs
Sony Music singles
Roxy Recordings singles
Tomas Andersson Wij songs
Towa Carson songs
Siw Malmkvist songs
Ann-Louise Hanson songs